Rolland Pierce "Rollie" Culver (October 29, 1908 – December 8, 1984) was an American jazz drummer.

Career 
Culver's first entry into professional entertainment was as a tap dancer, but he concentrated on drumming after 1930. He played in the territory band of Heinie Beau for most of the 1930s, then, in 1941, began playing with Red Nichols. He drummed behind Nichols for more than twenty years, working with him right up to Nichols's death. Other associations include work with Jack Delaney and Raymond Burke, and as a session musician for film soundtracks.

References

American jazz drummers
1908 births
1984 deaths
People from Fond du Lac, Wisconsin
Musicians from Wisconsin
20th-century American drummers
American male drummers
20th-century American male musicians
American male jazz musicians